Cala Iris Islet is a small island in Morocco, located in the Alboran Sea in the bay of the  village, Al Hoceima Province. It is about 500 m off the Cala Iris beach. This island is a part of the Al Hoceima National Park. Cala Iris Islet is one of the few places where the ribbed Mediterranean limpet (Patella ferruginea) has survived, with a population of 110 specimens.

References 

Islands of Morocco
Uninhabited islands
National parks of Morocco